National Poison Prevention Week is observed in the United States the third week of March.  The goal of the week is to raise awareness of the risk of being poisoned by household products, medicines, pesticides, plants, bites and stings, food poisoning, and fumes.  Awareness being duly raised, it is hoped that this will prevent poisoning.

Origin

On September 26, 1961, the 87th United States Congress passed a joint resolution requesting that the President of the United States proclaim the third week of March National Poison Prevention Week.  On February 7, 1962, President John F. Kennedy responded to this request and proclaimed the third week of March as National Poison Prevention Week.  The first National Poison Prevention Week was therefore observed in March 1962.

Poisoning: A National Scourge

More than two million potential poison exposures are reported every year to American poison control centers.  More than 90% of these poisoning occur in the home, and a majority of these occur with children five years of age and younger.

Though calls regarding children still make up more than half of all calls to poison control centers, they only account for a small percent of the deaths due to poisoning.  Poisoning of adults is on the rise in our nation and only stands behind motor vehicle accidents as the leading cause of unintentional injury deaths.

Over 1000 Americans die from poisoning every year.

Poisoning: Prevent It

The American Association of Poison Control Centers, representing the poison control center network of the United States, offers the following poison prevention tips:

 If you think someone has been poisoned, call 1-800-222-1222 right away.  Serious poisonings don't always have early signs.
 Put the number for your poison control center (1-800-222-1222) in your cell phone and near home phones.
 Keep medicines and household products in their original containers in a different place than food.
 Always read product labels and follow any directions.
 Keep household products and medicines locked up.  Put them where kids can't see them or reach them.
 Buy products with child-resistant packaging.  But remember, nothing is child-proof.
 Never call medicine "candy."  Poisons may look like food or drink.  Teach children to ask an adult before tasting anything.
 Learn about products and drugs that young people use to get "high."  Talk to your teen or pre-teen about these dangers.
 Have a working carbon monoxide alarm in your home.

Call 1-800-222-1222 to reach your local poison control center, anywhere in the United States.  The call is free, private, 24/7/365, and expert help is available in more than 150 languages.

The National Poison Prevention Week Council

The National Poison Week Prevention Week Council was established in early 1962 to oversee the national observation of National Poison Prevention Week.

As of August 2011, the National Poison Prevention Week Council included representatives of the following organizations:

 American Academy of Clinical Toxicology
 American Academy of Pediatrics
 American Association of Poison Control Centers
 American Cleaning Institute
 American College of Emergency Physicians
 American Pharmacists Association
 American Red Cross National Headquarters
 American Society for Testing and Materials
 Art & Creative Materials Institute
 Closure & Container Manufacturers Association
 Consumer Healthcare Products Association
 Consumer Specialty Products Association
 Healthcare Compliance Packaging Council
 National Association of Pediatric Nurse Practitioners
 National Community Pharmacists Association
 National Safety Council
 SAFE KIDS Worldwide
 U.S. Centers for Disease Control and Prevention
 U.S. Consumer Product Safety Commission
 U.S. Environmental Protection Agency
 Health Resources and Services Administration, HHS
 U.S. Environmental Protection Agency

References

External links

 Presidential Proclamation Creating National Poison Prevention Week
 The Official National Poison Prevention Week website
 President Obama's Press Release on Poison Prevention Week 2009

March observances
Awareness weeks in the United States
Presidency of John F. Kennedy
Observances in the United States
Health observances